Bernard was the sixth Archdeacon of Totnes, holding that office at some time between 1165 and 1184.

References

Archdeacons of Totnes